Kempley Daffodil Meadow is a  biological Site of Special Scientific Interest in Gloucestershire, notified in 1986.

The site is listed in the 'Forest of Dean Local Plan Review' as a Key Wildlife Site (KWS).

Location and regional interest
The site is one of a limited number of similar meadows and woods in the Dymock and Newent areas which support the flowering of wild daffodil. The meadows are unimproved neutral grassland.

Dymock Woods is a nearby Site of Scientific Interest and supports flowering of wild daffodil, and there is a Daffodil Trail which incorporates a number of local nature reserves which support the conservation of the species.

Flora and conservation
Natural England, in its report of May 2011, reports the coverage and density of the flowering as being 75% of the whole field and between 40% to 60% cover. Other species recorded in the meadow are lesser celandine, common sorrel, cuckooflower and creeping buttercup. The presence of a significant number of bumblebees was noted.

References

SSSI Source
 Natural England SSSI information on the citation
 Natural England SSSI information on the Kempley Daffodil Meadow unit

External links
 Natural England (SSSI information)

Sites of Special Scientific Interest in Gloucestershire
Sites of Special Scientific Interest notified in 1986
Meadows in Gloucestershire